Catch Bull at Four is the sixth studio album by Cat Stevens. The title is taken from one of the Ten Bulls of Zen.

In the United States the album spent three weeks at number one on the Billboard 200. It also reached number one in Australia and Canada and became Stevens's second consecutive album to reach number two on the UK Albums Chart. The song "Sitting" was released as a single in July 1972, reaching 16 on the Billboard Hot 100.

Critical reception
Catch Bull at Four was well received both commercially and critically. Rolling Stone was satisfied with the "gorgeous melody and orchestration", while simultaneously disappointed by the lack of a single track comparable to "Morning Has Broken" from Teaser and the Firecat.

Track listing
All songs written by Cat Stevens except as noted.

Side one
 "Sitting" – 3:14
 "Boy with a Moon & Star on His Head" – 5:57
 "Angelsea" – 4:30
 "Silent Sunlight" – 3:00
 "Can't Keep It In" – 2:59

Side two
 "18th Avenue (Kansas City Nightmare)" – 4:21
 "Freezing Steel" – 3:40
 "O Caritas" (Andreas Toumazis, Jeremy Taylor, Stevens) – 3:41
 "Sweet Scarlet" – 3:49
 "Ruins" – 4:24

Personnel
Cat Stevens – lead and backing vocals, Grand piano, Fender Rhodes electric piano, Wurlitzer electric piano, RMI Electra piano, Böhm Diamond organ, synthesizer, Spanish guitar, acoustic guitar, electric guitar, electric mandolin, pennywhistle, drums, percussion
Alun Davies – acoustic guitar, Spanish guitar, backing vocals
Jeremy Taylor – Spanish guitar, (assisted in translating "O' Caritas" into the Latin language used in the song).
Andreas Toumazis – bouzouki on "O Caritas"
Alan James – bass, backing vocals
Jean Roussel – piano, Hammond organ, Electric piano
Gerry Conway – drums, percussion, backing vocals
C.S. Choir – backing vocals on "Freezing Steel" and "O Caritas"
Linda Lewis – backing vocals on "Angelsea"
Lauren Cooper – backing vocals on "Angelsea"
Del Newman – string arrangements

Production
Paul Samwell-Smith - producer

Chart positions

Weekly charts

Year-end charts

Certifications

}

External links
Album details
Album information at catstevens.com
Album review

References

Cat Stevens albums
1972 albums
Albums produced by Paul Samwell-Smith
Island Records albums
A&M Records albums
Albums recorded at Morgan Sound Studios
Albums recorded in a home studio